Canada: The Story of Us is a Canadian historical docudrama television series, which aired on CBC Television in 2017. Produced by Bristow Global Media, the 10-part series focuses on several significant periods in Canadian history, using dramatic reenactments to depict key moments and featuring commentary from Canadian public and entertainment figures. It is similar to other docudramas produced by Nutopia for the U.S. and Australia.

The series featured an introduction by Prime Minister Justin Trudeau.

Episodes

Criticism
The program's first episode faced significant criticism, particularly for eliding First Nations and Acadian history in favour of treating the establishment of New France as the primary starting point to Canadian history. A number of politicians in Quebec also criticized the program's portrayal of New France as inaccurate, including the depiction of Samuel de Champlain as dirty and unkempt in a diplomatic meeting with the Wendat, even while James Wolfe was portrayed as clean in the middle of his physical climb up Cap Diamant. As well, the series was criticized for using primarily anglophone actors with poor French skills to portray the French Canadian settlers instead of selecting francophone actors.

The Globe and Mail journalist Konrad Yakabuski linked the program's critical response to the CBC's reliance on an outside production firm, due to the closure of its internal documentary production unit in 2015. He compared the series to the much more favourably received 2000 series Canada: A People's History, an internal production which was a collaboration between the CBC's English and French divisions and thus avoided the pitfalls around depiction of French Canadian history that marred The Story of Us. The Huffington Post blogger D. K. Latta noted that the program's primary narrative thrust appeared to be the history of Canadian business and entrepreneurship rather than a comprehensive history of Canada as a whole.

Federal Member of Parliament Pierre Nantel successfully moved to have a representative from the CBC appear before the Canadian House of Commons Standing Committee on Canadian Heritage to discuss the series and its reception.

Response
The CBC and Bristow Global Media responded to the criticism by stating that the series was not meant to be a definitive or linear history of Canada, but simply to illustrate and depict 50 selected moments. The criticism resulted in the CBC scheduling a series of "live digital conversations", for viewers to discuss and debate the remaining episodes.

References

2010s Canadian documentary television series
2017 Canadian television series debuts
CBC Television original programming
2017 Canadian television series endings
Studies of Canadian history